Latin American Policy (LAP): A Journal of Politics and Governance in a Changing Region is a biannual peer-reviewed academic journal published by Wiley-Blackwell on behalf of the Policy Studies Organization and the Instituto Tecnológico de Estudios Superiores de Monterrey, Santa Fe.  The journal was established in 2010 with editor-in-chief Isidro Morales Moreno (Tecnológico de Monterrey). The journal focuses on public policy and political science in Latin America.

References

External links 
 

Wiley-Blackwell academic journals
English-language journals
Publications established in 2010
Political science journals